"Spaceman" is a song by American alternative rock band 4 Non Blondes. It is the sixth track on their only studio album, Bigger, Better, Faster, More! (1992), and was released as the album's third single in September 1993. While the album's lead single, "What's Up?", became a worldwide hit, "Spaceman" reached the top 20 only in Austria, Iceland, Italy and Switzerland and missed the US Billboard Hot 100.

Composition
"Spaceman" is composed in the key of G major and is set in common time with a slow tempo of 69 beats per minute. The song is three minutes and forty seconds long.

Critical reception
Tom Demalon from AllMusic stated that the song's "yearning lyrics are delivered over a quiet, martial drum rhythm." Larry Flick from Billboard wrote, "Follow-up to the gold-selling "What's Up?" is fueled by a similar wall-shattering vocal performance. The tune itself is a strumming, guitar-anchored rock ballad, deriving much of its motion from a rolling, militaristic beat. While it is not immediately catchy, slowly ingratiating track will likely meet with warm approval at top 40 and album-rock levels." Alan Jones from Music Week gave it three out of five, adding that the song "offers pretty much the same mix [as its predecessor], with the same unrestrained vocals and loosely fitting instrumentation. But it's a less heady brew that won't fare quite so well."

Music video
The song's music video was directed by Scott Kalvert and filmed in Los Angeles. It features the band performing the song in several locations, including inside a house with colorful lights, in a sunny park, and under a full moon. The video was added to the playlists of MTV and The Box on the week ending September 26, 1993.

Track listings
All songs were written by Linda Perry, with co-writing from Shaunna Hall on "Spaceman" and Roger Rocha on "Strange".

 US cassette single
A. "Spaceman" – 3:30
B. "Pleasantly Blue" – 2:27

 UK CD single
 "Spaceman" – 3:40
 "Strange" – 4:04
 "Pleasantly Blue" – 2:27
 "What's Up?" (remix) – 4:51

 UK 7-inch and cassette single
 "Spaceman" – 3:40
 "Strange" – 4:04

 UK 12-inch single
A1. "Spaceman" – 3:40
A2. "Strange" – 4:04
B1. "What's Up?" (remix) – 4:51
B2. "What's Up?" (piano version) – 4:09

Credits and personnel
Credits are lifted from the Bigger, Better, Faster, More! album booklet.

Studios
 Recorded at Groove Masters (Santa Monica, California)
 Mixed and overdubbed at The Bunker (Malibu, California)
 Mastered at Precision Mastering (Los Angeles)

Personnel

 Linda Perry – writing, vocals, acoustic and electric guitar
 Shaunna Hall – writing, additional guitar
 Roger Rocha – guitar
 Christa Hillhouse – bass, vocals
 Dawn Richardson – drums
 Rory Kaplan – Mellotron
 Suzie Katayama – accordion
 David Tickle – production, recording, mixing
 Mark Hensley – engineering
 Stephen Marcussen – mastering

Charts

Weekly charts

Year-end charts

Release history

References

1990s ballads
1992 songs
1993 singles
4 Non Blondes songs
Interscope Records singles
Songs about outer space
Rock ballads
Songs written by Linda Perry